The Department of Tourism (DOT) is the executive department of the Philippine government responsible for the regulation of the Philippine tourism industry and the promotion of the Philippines as a tourist destination.

History
Started as a private initiative to promote the Philippines as a major travel destination, the Philippine Tourist & Travel Association was organized in 1950. In 1956, the Board of Travel and Tourist Industry was created by Congress As stipulated in the Integrated Reorganization Plan in 1972 sanctioned as a law under Presidential Decree No. 2, as amended, the Department of Trade and Tourism was established, reorganizing the then Department of Commerce and Industry. A Philippine Tourism Commission was created under the unified Trade and Tourism Department to oversee the growth of the tourism industry as a source of economic benefit for the country.

In 1973, President Ferdinand Marcos created a new cabinet-level Department of Tourism (DOT) by splitting the Department of Trade and Tourism into two separate departments. Included in the new Department of Tourism, the agency Philippine Tourism Authority (PTA) and the Philippine Convention Bureau (PCB) were created. The Department of Tourism was then renamed Ministry of Tourism as a result of the shift in the form of government pursuant to the enforcement of the 1973 Constitution.

In 1986, under Executive Order Nos. 120 and 120-A signed by President Corazon Aquino, the Department of Tourism was reorganized and, correspondingly, the  Convention Bureau was renamed the Philippine Convention and Visitors Corporation, and the Intramuros Administration was attached, previously being under the defunct Ministry of Human Settlements. In 1998, the Department of Tourism assumed a prominent role in the culmination of centennial celebration of the country's independence from the Spanish Empire in 1898.

In 2003, the Department of Tourism initiated one of its most successful tourism promotion projects, WOW Philippines, under Secretary Richard J. Gordon.

The latest improvements in the tourism industry in the country came about with the passage of Republic Act No. 9593 or the "Tourism Act of 2009."

Organization structure
The department is headed by the Secretary of Tourism (Philippines), with the following four undersecretaries and assistant secretaries.
Undersecretary for Administration and Special Concerns
Undersecretary for Public Affairs, Communications & Special Projects
Undersecretary for Tourism Development Planning
Undersecretary for Tourism Promotions
Undersecretary for Tourism Regulation Coordination & Resource Generations 
Assistant Secretary for Administration and Special Concerns
Assistant Secretary for Public Affairs, Communications and Special Projects
Assistant Secretary for Product and Market Development
Assistant Secretary for Tourism Regulation Coordination & Resource Generation for Metro Manila Cluster
Assistant Secretary for Tourism Regulation Coordination & Resource Generation for Luzon and Visayas

Bureaus and offices
 Bureau of Domestic Tourism Promotions and Information
Bureau of International Tourism Promotions
Office of Product Development
Office of Tourism Coordination
Office of Tourism Development Planning
 Office of Tourism Information
 Office of Tourism Standards

Agencies of the Department of Tourism
Also known as the "DOT Family", the following agencies are attached to the DOT and shall be under the supervision of the Secretary for program and policy coordination:
 Tourism Promotions Board (TPB)
 Intramuros Administration (IA)
 National Parks Development Committee (NPDC)
 Tourism Infrastructure and Enterprise Zone Authority (TIEZA), formerly Philippine Tourism Authority (PTA)
 Duty-Free Philippines Corporation (DFPC)
 Nayong Pilipino Foundation (NPF)
 Philippine Retirement Authority (PRA)
 Philippine Commission on Sports Scuba Diving (PCSSD)

Tourism projects

 Visit Islands Philippines 1994
 Miss Universe 1994 (43rd Miss Universe)
 Florikultura '98 – international horticulture exhibition
 Expo Pilipino 1998 – Philippine Centennial International Exposition
 1998 Philippine Centennial Celebrations
 World Exposition 2002 Manila (cancelled due to financial problems of the government)
 Visit Philippines 2003
 WOW (World Of Wonders) Philippines
 "Pilipinas Kay Ganda" slogan and campaign 2010
 It's More Fun in the Philippines!
 Visit the Philippines Year 2015
 Visit the Philippines Again 2016
 Miss Universe 2016 (65th Miss Universe)
Boracay Rehabilitation 2018
2019 Southeast Asian Games

List of the Secretaries of the Department of Tourism

Tourism slogans
Fiesta Islands Philippines
 WOW Philippines (2002)
 Pilipinas Kay Ganda (2010)
 It's More Fun in the Philippines!
 Experience the Philippines (2017)

References

External links

Official DOT Philippines website
Official DOT Philippines Twitter account
DFPC website

 
Philippines, Tourism
Philippines
1973 establishments in the Philippines
Tourism
Establishments by Philippine presidential decree